Company Gallery is a contemporary art gallery located at 145 Elizabeth street in the Lower East Side neighborhood of Manhattan. The gallery was established in 2015 by Sophie Mörner. Since 2022, art dealer Taylor Trabulus became a partner in the gallery. The gallery was recipient of the 2019 Frieze New York Frame award.

Artists 
Tosh Basco
Jonathan Lyndon Chase
Yve Laris Cohen
TM Davy
Raúl de Nieves
Hayden Dunham
Leyla Faye
Estate of Barbara Hammer
Katherine Hubbard
Colette Lumiere
Troy Michie
Jeanette Mundt
Women's History Museum
Ambera Wellmann
Cajsa von Zeipel

References

External links
official site

Art galleries established in 2014
Art museums and galleries in Manhattan
Contemporary art galleries in the United States